Frederick Bradley may refer to:
Frederick Henry Bradley (1876–1943), English recipient of the Victoria Cross
Frederick Gordon Bradley (1886–1966), Canadian and Dominion of Newfoundland politician
Frederick Van Ness Bradley (1898–1947), American politician from Michigan
Fred Bradley (1920–2012), American baseball player
Frederick Deryl Bradley (born 1949), Canadian politician in Alberta
Fred Bradley (rower) (1908–?), British rower

See also
Frederick Bradlee, American football player